This is a list of the 33 administrative regions in the municipality of Rio de Janeiro, Brazil.

See also
Geography of Brazil
List of cities in Brazil

References

Rio de Janeiro (city)-related lists
Rio de Janeiro Administrative Regions